Charles W. Henry (born April 8, 1964) is a former American professional football player who was a tight end in the National Football League (NFL) and the World League of American Football (WLAF). He played for the Miami Dolphins of the NFL, and the Frankfurt Galaxy of the WLAF. Henry played collegiately at the University of Miami.

References

1964 births
Living people
American football tight ends
Frankfurt Galaxy players
Miami Dolphins players
Miami Hurricanes football players
Players of American football from St. Petersburg, Florida